Adhwaytham is a 1992 Indian Malayalam-language political crime thriller film directed by Priyadarshan and written by T. Damodaran. It stars Mohanlal, Jayaram, Chithra, Revathi, Innocent, and M. G. Soman. The songs in the film were composed by M. G. Radhakrishnan and the film score was composed by Johnson.

Plot
Swami Amritananda (Mohanlal) arrives in Kerala on a mission to bring peace at the state, which is burning with communal riots. Swamiji, who is worshiped and respected all over the world, receives death threats from different corners. Lakshmi IAS (Revathi), the District Collector, is assigned to look after Swamiji's security. She warns Swamiji about the tensed situation and the dangers waiting him outside. The presence of Lakshmi, who had been the lover of Swamiji in his past, brings back old memories to him.

Years ago, Swami Amritananda was Shivaprasad, the only son of his mother Saraswathy (Srividya), who had to undergo unpleasant experiences in her home from her own elder brother Sreedharan (Jagannatha Varma) and brother-in law Krishnan Kutty Menon (Janardhanan), a police officer, who was loyal to the government. The Communist party in those days was facing strong restrictions from the government for its anti-state activities. Shivan had always been a headache for his mother, for his rebellious nature. But Lakshmi, Sreedharan's daughter, was in love with him, which was opposed bitterly by Sreedharan and family. Shivan, slowly got involved with the Communist movement and in short time became their political goonda. Shivan gets involved in several petty crimes and thus invites more anger from his uncle Krishnan Kutty Menon. Karthy (Chithra), a lady party worker with strong naxalite leanings develops a strong passion towards Shivan, but he is unaware of it. Vasu (Jayaram), his close friend since childhood, is a fun loving character, who always saves Shivan from several issues.

Shekharan (M. G. Soman), the party leader identifies the potential of Shivan and cunningly decides to use it maximum for his own personal benefit. Unaware of the shrewd tactics by Shekharan, Shivan gets involved in several crimes, one after another. One day, Karthy, in order to separate Lakshmi from Shivan, fabricates a story about her relation with him. She succeeds in making Lakshmi believe about her illicit affair with Shivan. Thinking that Shivan was just double dating her, Lakshmi informs police about Shivan's hideout and he is arrested and sentenced for a couple of years. This incident changes Shivan completely. He turns into a hardcore criminal, and develops a hatred towards Lakshmi.

In a couple of years, the political scene in the state changes. The Communist Party wins power, and Shivan is released from jail. He is appointed as the secretary of the Temple Devaswom, and Lakshmi is now an IAS officer, who is now holding the post of Devaswom Administrator under Shivan. He tries maximum to belittle her. Shivan, a complete corrupt person, now tries the maximum to loot the temple. The temple staff under Sreekanta Poduval (Narendra Prasad) tries to protest, but ends in vain. Vasu is brought into the temple by Shivan, to create a division among the temple staff. Lakshmi tries to convince Vasu, but he expresses loyalty to Shivan, his close friend, without knowing his corrupt ways or political ambitions. Vasu, with in this time falls for the daughter of Thantri Parameshwaran Namboothiri (Thikkurissy Sukumaran Nair), the head priest of the temple. But she avoids him completely. Vasu, a lower caste by birth, has no chance to win her, who is already engaged to Chitran Namboothiri (Manianpilla Raju).

Under the instructions of Shekharan, Shivan steals the sacred ornament and during the investigation the Thantri is arrested for the theft. Shivan's motive behind the plan was to regain Krishnan Kutty's house. Upon being confronted by the Thantri's daughter, Vasu withdraws his statement against the Thantri. Due to the embarrassment he faced after release, the Thantri kills himself. 

Vasu soon gains a position in the Devaswom Board, and sides with the common people instead of Shivan during the meetings. Upon realizing that he could be a threat, Shekharan cleverly reveals Vasu's real motives in front of everyone to get him kicked out. On the flip side, he is allowed to stay as he repented his mistakes. Following these incidents, Shivan and Vasu's friendship goes through a rough phase.

Later, Lakshmi learns that Karthy, who was in jail at that point, had made her believe a false story because of the party's agenda. Upon revealing the truth to Shivan, Vasu goes on to fix his relationship with Shivan. Vasu soon confronts Shekharan and threatens to reveal the truth to the cops; soon after he leaves, some goons under the aegis of Pathrose (Captain Raju), an accomplice of Shekharan, follow him to finish him off. Upon coming to know about the plans, Shivan hurries to save Vasu. After a showdown with some goons, Shivan learns that Vasu had been killed by Pathrose before his arrival. After Vasu's death, Shivan attempts to take Shekharan's life; instead, the police are called and Shivan is arrested. Meanwhile, Shivan's mother Saraswathy passes away thinking that he killed Vasu. After his mother's death, Shivan leaves his home to live a spiritual life in various temples around the country, thus eventually making him a renowned spiritual leader.  

Back to the present, Shekharan and his accomplices plan to kill Swami Amritananda in an attempt to save their face. The plan is to kill Swami Amritananda during the "Ratha-Yatra" using a bomb. As soon as Lakshmi learns about the plan through Kaiyathan (Kuthiravattam Pappu), a former aide of Shekharan, she does everything in her right to save Swami's life; in the process, she gives her own life to save the Swami. 

After Lakshmi's death, Swamiji goes back to Shivan's avatar to seek revenge for everything he lost. Finally, he kills Shekharan, Pathrose, Krishnan Kutty Menon, and all their other accomplices. In the end, Shivan accepts his actions in front of the town and urges them to stay united, instead of being divided.

Cast
Mohanlal as Swami Amritananda / Shivamanikandan
Jayaram as Vasu
Revathi as Lakshmi, an IAS officer
Soumya as Thampuratti, Parameshwaran Namboothiri's daughter
Chithra as Karthyani
M. G. Soman as Shekharan
Innocent as DIG Sheshadri Iyer, a corrupt police officer and Shekharan's accomplice
Janardhanan as Krishnankutty Menon, a corrupt police officer, Shivan's uncle, and Shekharan's accomplice
Srividya as Saraswathy, Shivamanikandan's Mother
Narendra Prasad as Sreekantan Pothuval
Jagannatha Varma as Sreedharan, Saraswathy's elder brother and Lakshmi's father 
Sukumari as Naniyamma, Vasu's mother
Thikkurissy Sukumaran Nair as Thantri Parameshwaran Namboothiri
Kuthiravattam Pappu as Kaiyathan, Shekharan's aide
Maniyanpilla Raju as Chithran Namboothiri
Captain Raju as Pathrose, Shekharan's accomplice
Raghavan as Brahmadathan Namboothirippadu, Shivan's Father
Sankaradi as Gopalan Pillai, former state minister
Bheeman Raghu as Goonda
Augustine as Goonda
Alummoodan as State Minister
Pavithran as Goonda
Aranmula Ponnamma as Shivan and Lakshmi's grandmother (Sreedharan and Saraswathy's mother)
Renuka as Krishnankutty Menon's wife (Sreedharan and Saraswathy's younger sister)
Kozhikode Narayanan Nair as Pookoya Thangal, an influential muslim political leader
Kunjandi as Driver

Production 
The filming took place in Kozhikode, Kerala. The art director was Sabu Cyril.  The film features sequences in temple set, for that they created a temple similar to the Guruvayur Lord Krishnna Temple in Kozhikode.

Soundtrack 

The song "Ambalappuzhe" is a popular number from the film. It was composed after the lyrics were written. Composition took place at the Woodlands Hotel in Chennai in 1992. Priyadarshan, M. G. Sreekumar, and lyricist Kaithapram Damodaran Namboothiri was also present along with composer Radhakrishnan. They wanted a song relating to temple. Both Priyadarshan and Sreekumar wanted the song to start with the line Ambalappuzha, where Ambalappuzha Sri Krishna Temple is situated. Right after, Kaithapram wrote the first line "Ambalappuzhe Unni Kannanodu Nee" for which Radhakrishnan prepared a tune, this continued for each line after line. Recording took place at the Kothandapani Studio in Chennai, where Sreekumar and K. S. Chithra sang it together. Musical notations were given at 07:00 AM IST in the morning, recording was finished by 01:00 PM. Instruments such as violin and flute were used. The song features Jayaram in the film.

Release
Adhwaytham released on 3 September 1992 and became a huge success in boxoffice ran 125 days in kozhikode.

Awards

 Kerala Film Chamber Award for Best Social Criticism Film

References

External links 
 

1990s Malayalam-language films
1992 crime thriller films
Indian crime thriller films
Films shot in Kozhikode
Films about organised crime in India
Films scored by M. G. Radhakrishnan
Films directed by Priyadarshan